The UC Riverside Highlanders represent the University of California, Riverside (UCR) in Riverside, California in 15 men's and women's intercollegiate athletics. The Highlanders compete in NCAA Division I; they are members of the Big West Conference.

In 2020, the future of UCR's sports program was placed into doubt, as the university's leadership were considering cutting the entire athletics department in response to financial strain caused by the COVID-19 pandemic. However, in May 2021, the university announced that they had decided against eliminating athletics and would instead continue sponsoring all sports at the Division I level.

Sports sponsored

Baseball

The UC Riverside Highlanders baseball team is the varsity intercollegiate baseball team of the University of California, Riverside. The team is a member of the Big West Conference, which is part of the NCAA Division I. UC Riverside's first baseball team was fielded in 1958. The team plays its home games at the 2,500-seat Riverside Sports Complex.

Basketball

Men's basketball

The UC Riverside Highlanders men's basketball team represents the University of California, Riverside. The school's team currently competes in the Big West Conference, which is part of the NCAA Division I. UC Riverside's first men's basketball team was fielded during the 1958–59 season. The team plays its home games at the 3,168-seat Student Recreation Center Arena.

Women's basketball

The UC Riverside Highlanders women's basketball team represents the University of California, Riverside. The school's team currently competes in the Big West Conference, which is part of the NCAA Division I. UC Riverside's first women's basketball team was fielded during the 1977–78 season. The team plays its home games at the 3,168-seat Student Recreation Center Arena.

Soccer

Men's soccer

The UC Riverside Highlanders men's soccer team have an NCAA Division I Tournament record of 0–1 through one appearance.

Women's soccer

The UC Riverside Highlanders women's soccer team have an NCAA Division I Tournament record of 0–1 through one appearance.

Former varsity sports

Football
The UC Riverside Highlanders football team played from 1955 until the program was disbanded in 1975. The team played at Highlander Stadium.

Championships

Appearances

The UC Riverside Highlanders competed in the NCAA Tournament across 6 active sports (2 men's and 4 women's) 10 times at the Division I level.

 Baseball (2): 2003, 2007
 Women's basketball (3): 2006, 2007, 2010
 Men's soccer (1): 2018
 Women's soccer (1): 2005
 Women's indoor track and field (2): 2009, 2016
 Women's outdoor track and field (1): 2009

Team

UC Riverside has never won a national championship at the NCAA Division I level.

UC Riverside won 4 national championships at the NCAA Division II level.

 Baseball (2): 1977, 1982
 Women's volleyball (2): 1982, 1986

Below is one national championship that was not bestowed by the NCAA:

 Women's volleyball – Division II (1): 1977 (AIAW)

Individual

UC Riverside had 1 Highlander win an NCAA individual championship at the Division I level.

At the NCAA Division II level, UC Riverside garnered 11 individual championships.

Traditions

Mascot
"Scotty Highlander" is the mascot for UC Riverside. The original mascot was an aggressive little bear wearing a kilt for the school's logo. In 1998, a referendum to move to NCAA Division I was passed and the students approached the administration requesting a new mascot and the old mascot was replaced. In 2011, the mascot was updated again with students voting online and a new "Scotty Highlander" mascot, featuring a roaring bear wearing a plaid Tam o' Shanter was chosen.

School colors
All schools in the University of California System have a combination of blue and gold as their school colors. UC Riverside follows this tradition.

See also
List of NCAA Division I institutions

References

External links